The Green Swamp is a swamp that lies in Brunswick and Columbus counties in North Carolina. The  swamp was designated a National Natural Landmark in 1974. The carnivorous plant known as the Venus Flytrap is found within this swamp, and it is important for other unique and endangered species. North Carolina laws prohibit the removal of these plants from their habitat. The wetlands support a rich ecology and are important as habitat along the Atlantic Flyway of migrating birds and other species.

The Nature Conservancy manages  of the swamp as the Green Swamp Preserve.

Green Swamp, North Carolina is the current tribal homeland of the state-recognized  Waccamaw Siouan tribe of Native Americans; one of eight in the state.

References

External links

Protected areas of Brunswick County, North Carolina
National Natural Landmarks in North Carolina
Swamps of North Carolina
Nature reserves in North Carolina
Protected areas of Columbus County, North Carolina
Nature Conservancy preserves
Landforms of Columbus County, North Carolina
Landforms of Brunswick County, North Carolina
Pocosins